The Styria municipal structural reform (German: Steiermärkische Gemeindestrukturreform) was a local government reform in the Austrian state of Styria, which was made effective January 1, 2015. The reform nearly halved the number of Styrian municipalities as the reduced from 542 to 287. The reform was intended to reduce costs and ease election of new town officials. The terms of the reform is formalized in the Styrian Municipality Structural Reform Act. (StGsrG).

Background
As a result of the reform, the number of municipalities in Styria was reduced from 542 to 287 municipalities, a decrease of 255. Though the main parts of the reform didn't come into effect until 1 January 2015, several changes happened before then: On 1 January 2013, the former Gemeinden (municipalities) of Buch-Geiseldorf and Sankt Magdalena am Lemberg were merged as the new municipality Buch-St. Magdalena. Likewise, the former municipalities of Gai and Hafning bei Trofaiach were incorporated into the municipality Trofaiach. Both were done before the actual reform, reducing the number of municipalities in Styria to 539.

In total, 385 of the old municipalities were affected in some way (by inclusion of other municipalities or parts of municipalities, territorial changes or resolution), and 157 municipalities (about 55% of the new municipalities) remained unchanged.

Leading up to the reform, there were plans to expand the City of Graz by incorporating several neighboring municipalities into it, but these plans were not carried out.

After the reform, 251 old community names remained (though some of these names were now held by expanded municipalities). The names of Kirchbach in der Steiermark and Neumarkt in der Steiermark merely added the definite article "der". Many new municipal names were either shortenings of old names, or combinations of old names. One new municipality, Sankt Barbara im Mürztal, was named for the patron saint of miners, as it was a merger of three old municipalities that were roughly equal in population and importance.

New names of municipalities
As of October 2016, the reform has created 36 new town names, which are not just the largest of the former towns in each merger. The new names of municipalities include:

 Aflenz
 Buch-St. Magdalena
 Dobl-Zwaring
 Ehrenhausen an der Weinstraße
 Feistritztal
 Fernitz-Mellach
 Geistthal-Södingberg
 Gratwein-Straßengel
 Gutenberg-Stenzengreith
 Hirschegg-Pack
 Irdning-Donnersbachtal
 Kirchbach-Zerlach
 Krakau
 Leutschach an der Weinstraße
 Lobmingtal
 Michaelerberg-Pruggern
 Mitterberg-Sankt Martin
 Oberwölz
 Pischelsdorf am Kulm
 Pöls-Oberkurzheim
 Pölstal
 Premstätten
 Raaba-Grambach
 Sankt Barbara im Mürztal
 Sankt Magdalena am Lemberg
 Sankt Marein-Feistritz
 Sankt Veit in der Südsteiermark
 Schwarzautal
 Seiersberg-Pirka
 Söding-Sankt Johann
 Sölk
 Stadl-Predlitz
 Stainach-Pürgg
 Teufenbach-Katsch
 Tragöß-Sankt Katharein
 Waldbach-Mönichwald

Detailed list of the new municipalities
From the formerly 539 independent communities (as of December 2014), these 287 new municipalities were formed on 1 January 2015 (157 unchanged municipalities are highlighted as dark gray, while 251 community names that continue to exist exactly, are in bold) [52]

The five municipalities Kohlberg, Limbach bei Neudau, Oberstorcha, Schlag bei Thalberg and Stocking are listed in the left column in each case twice, because their territory has been divided in two municipalities. In the second column, the former entire population is shown, but only the relevant part was added into the new sum.

Gnas was reconstituted from most parts (9 municipalities + 1 local part), and furthermore only Feldbach and Neumarkt in der Steiermark, from 7 parts each.

 The number of inhabitants of the newly formed municipalities equal to the combined populations of all member municipalities as of 1 January 2014. Since five formerly independent municipalities were divided into two different new towns, the listed populations of these newly formed municipalities are not yet definitively applicable. The new data, as of 1 January 2015, from Statistik Austria are stored at Template:Metadata population AT-6.

The new municipalities mostly took the name of only one of the old municipalities that they were created from. In 21 cases, two old names (or parts of old names) were put together with a hyphen, new names were created by rewording (Ehrenhausen an der Weinstraße, Leutschach an der Weinstraße, Pischelsdorf am Kulm, Sankt Georgen am Kreischberg, Sankt Veit in der Südsteiermark) or by simplifying (Aflenz, Krakau, Oberwölz, Schwarzautal, Sölk) from the core term of two. Kirchberg in der Steiermark and Neumarkt in der Steiermark's names were only changed by adding the article "der". For Feistritztal, Pölstal and St. Barbara in Mürztal entirely new names were chosen for the new municipality. For Hieflau and others, the district boundaries have been moved.

References

External links
 :de:Sankt Barbara im Mürztal - page about new town in German WP

Government of Austria